Terlipressin, sold under the brand name Terlivaz  among others, is an analogue of vasopressin used as a vasoactive drug in the management of low blood pressure.  It has been found to be effective when norepinephrine does not help. Terlipressin is a vasopressin receptor agonist.

Terlipressin was approved for medical use in the United States in 2022. The US Food and Drug Administration (FDA) considers it to be a first-in-class medication.

Medical uses 
Terlipressin is indicated to improve kidney function in adults with hepatorenal syndrome with rapid reduction in kidney function.

Indications for use include norepinephrine-resistant septic shock and hepatorenal syndrome. In addition, it is used to treat bleeding esophageal varices.

Contraindications
Terlipressin is contraindicated in people experiencing hypoxia or worsening respiratory symptoms and in people with ongoing coronary, peripheral or mesenteric ischemia. Terlipressin may cause fetal harm when used during pregnancy.

Society and culture 
Terlipressin is available in United States, New Zealand, Australia, the European Union, India, Pakistan & UAE. It is sold under various brand names including Glypressin and Terlivaz.

References

External links 
 

Vasoconstrictors
Peptides
Vasopressin receptor agonists
Antidiuretics